is a former Japanese football player.

Playing career
Jun Shimizu played for Banditonce Kakogawa and Fukushima United FC from 2008 to 2014.

References

External links

1985 births
Living people
Asia University (Japan) alumni
Association football people from Saitama Prefecture
Japanese footballers
J3 League players
Japan Football League players
Fukushima United FC players
Association football defenders